is a Japanese composer, arranger and music producer. With a career spanning over 40 years (beginning in the late 1970s), he is best known for his works as a record producer for acts including various choir members Mike Wyzgowski, Misia, Satoshi Tomiie, and Ken Hirai. Sagisu has also worked as a film composer for several anime and films, being well known for his collaborations with Gainax, especially in the soundtrack of Hideaki Anno's series Neon Genesis Evangelion.

Sagisu's career in music started in 1977, when he became one of the members of jazz fusion band T-Square. He made three albums with the group before becoming a full-time composer and writer in 1979. By 1997, he had composed over 2,000 songs, advertising jingles and TV and movie pieces. Sagisu won the Tokyo Anime Award for "Best Music" in 2010 for Evangelion: 2.0 You Can (Not) Advance. Sagisu arranged a rendition of the Japanese national anthem, "Kimigayo", performed at the 2020 Summer Olympics opening ceremony by Misia.

Discography

Solo

T-Square

Works

Anime

TV series

Films and original video animations

Theatrical films

Television dramas

Video games

See also
 An Music School

Notes

References

External links
 Official website
 Discography at VGMdb
 
 

Shirō Sagisu
1957 births
20th-century Japanese composers
21st-century Japanese composers
Anime composers
Japanese film score composers
Japanese male film score composers
Japanese music arrangers
Japanese record producers
Japanese television composers
Living people
Male television composers
Musicians from Setagaya
People from Setagaya